Kent Couch is an American cluster balloonist who drew international interest for his flights across the state of Oregon.

Cluster balloon flights
Couch, a 47-year-old gas station owner, first flew  in July 2007 riding a lawnchair elevated by 105 large helium balloons. Using amateur instruments to measure altitude and speed, a GPS device to track his location, and 5 gallons (19 litres) of water for ballast, he controlled his descent by releasing water. The flight began in Bend, Oregon and ended in Union, short of Couch's goal of reaching Idaho.

Couch began another flight at dawn on Saturday, July 5, 2008.  That afternoon he successfully crossed the desert border, landing near Cambridge, Idaho.

See also
 Cluster ballooning
 Larry Walters

References

External links
 CNN Article - "Man flies 193 miles in lawn chair"
 Official Kent Couch website
  - a 2003 Australian film with a similar storyline

American balloonists
1959 births
Living people
People from Bend, Oregon
Balloon flight record holders
American aviation record holders